William Crowche (by 1503–1586), of Englishcombe and Wellow, Somerset, was an English politician.

He was a Member (MP) of the Parliament of England for Calne in 1529, for Leominster in 1547, for Bath in April 1554 and November 1554 and for Melcombe Regis in 1555.

References

1586 deaths
People from Somerset
Year of birth uncertain
English MPs 1547–1552
English MPs 1554
English MPs 1554–1555
English MPs 1555